Golf Channel (also verbally referred to as simply "Golf") is an American sports television network owned by the NBC Sports Group division of NBCUniversal, a subsidiary of Comcast. Founded in Birmingham, Alabama, it is currently based out of NBC Sports' headquarters in Stamford, Connecticut.

The channel focuses on coverage of the sport of golf, including live coverage of tournaments, as well as factual and instructional programming. It is the cable television rightsholder of the PGA Tour, LPGA Tour, and PGA European Tour, and also holds rights to selected USGA tournaments and the NCAA Division I golf championships. Since 2016, it has also participated in NBC's coverage of the Summer Olympics, focusing on its golf competitions.

Via the Golf Channel unit, Comcast also owns other golf-related businesses, including the course reservation service GolfNow, online golf instruction provider Revolution Golf, and the World Long Drive Championship. Some of these associated properties operate from the network's former home of Orlando, Florida.

As of September 2018, Golf Channel is available to approximately 70.3 million pay television households (76.2% of households with cable) in the United States.

History 
The idea of a 24-hour golf network came from media entrepreneur Joseph E. Gibbs of Birmingham, Alabama, who first thought of such a concept in 1991. Gibbs felt there was enough interest in golf among the public to support such a network, and commissioned a Gallup Poll to see if his instincts were correct. With the support of the polling behind him, Gibbs and legendary golfer Arnold Palmer then secured $80 million in financing from several cable television providers (including Adelphia Communications Corporation, Cablevision Industries, Comcast, Continental Cablevision, Newhouse, and the Times Mirror Company) to launch the network, which was among the first subscription networks developed to cover one singular sport.

Announced in February 1993, the launch date was targeted for May 1994; and it was launched on January 17, 1995, with a ceremonial flip of the switch by co-founder Arnold Palmer. The first live tournament the channel televised was the Dubai Desert Classic, held January 19–22. Originally a premium channel with limited subscribers, it retooled in September 1995 to be part of basic-tier pay TV to reach more viewers, and ratings rapidly increased. In 1996, Fox Cable Networks acquired a minority stake in the channel for $50 million.

From 1999 to 2001, Golf Channel held part of the PGA Tour's cable rights for early-round coverage. To boost their availability, Golf Channel reached an agreement with Fox Sports Networks (FSN) to air simulcasts of the coverage. In 2002, Golf Channel lost its rights to the main PGA Tour, but gained rights to the developmental Buy.com Tour.

Acquisition by Comcast 
In 2001, Fox sold its 30.9% stake in Golf Channel, as well as its stake in Outdoor Life Network, to minority owner Comcast as part of a larger transaction by Fox to acquire Comcast's stake in Speedvision. In December 2003, Comcast acquired the remaining 8.6% stake of Golf Channel it did not already own from the Tribune Company, giving it full ownership.

In January 2007, Golf Channel became the exclusive cable broadcaster of the PGA Tour as part of a new 15-year contract, replacing ESPN and USA Network. The contract included early-round coverage of all official money events, and 13 events per-season carried exclusively by the network. By then, Golf Channel had carriage in 75 million homes.

Concurrently, Comcast also launched Versus/Golf HD, a 1080i high definition channel featuring programming from Golf Channel and sister network Versus. Golf Channel programming was broadcast during the daytime hours, and Versus programming was broadcast during the evening and primetime hours. This arrangement ended in December 2008, when both networks launched their own 24-hour high-definition simulcasts.

In March 2008, Comcast acquired the online golf reservation platform GolfNow. It was re-located to Golf Channel's headquarters in Orlando.

Merger with NBC Sports 
In January 2011, Comcast acquired a 51% majority stake in NBC Universal from General Electric. As a result of the re-alignment of Comcast's existing properties into NBC Universal, Golf Channel and sister sports network Versus were subsumed by a restructured NBC Sports division. On-air synergies between NBC's existing production unit began to take effect in February 2011 at the WGC Match Play Championship, when NBC's golf telecasts took on the Golf Channel branding as "Golf Channel on NBC", in a similar manner to ESPN's co-branding of sports output on ABC. NBC Sports personalities could now appear on Golf Channel, and former NBC Sports senior vice president Mike McCarley took over as the network's new head. The network also adopted an amended logo featuring the NBC peacock.

In December 2013, Golf Channel unveiled a new logo, implemented in May 2014 to coincide with the 2014 Players Championship. The new logo replaces the "swinging G" emblem that had been used since the network's launch with a wordmark alongside the NBC peacock. The new logo was meant to provide a unified brand across Golf Channel's associated properties and services.

In 2014, Golf Channel acquired rights to the NCAA Division I Men's Golf Championship. In 2015, it also began to broadcast the NCAA Division I Women's Golf Championships. In 2017, Golf Channel extended its rights to the tournaments through 2029.

On June 8, 2015, it was announced that NBC Sports had acquired rights to The Open Championship beginning in 2017 under a 12-year deal; after former broadcaster ESPN opted out of the final year of rights, NBC began coverage in 2016 instead. Early round coverage is aired by Golf Channel, which marked the first time ever that Golf Channel had ever broadcast one of the four Men's major golf championships. On May 3, 2016, NBC announced that Golf Channel would air the bulk of the men's and women's golf tournaments for the 2016 Summer Olympics, covering up to 300 hours of the tourney, with 130 of those hours live.

In 2016, Golf Channel acquired the World Long Drivers Association, organizer of the World Long Drive Championships; coverage of its events were subsequently added to the network. In 2017, Golf Channel acquired Revolution Golf, an online provider of golf instructional materials.

Before the final round of the 2018 Sony Open in Hawaii tournament, Golf Channel production staged a walkout.

In February 2019, Golf Channel announced a new subscription service known as GolfPass. The service will feature a variety of content, including a streaming library of archive content, instructional content, as well as special offers (such as credit for free round of golf per-year, and a premium tier offering additional discounts). Rory McIlroy will also be involved in the service, hosting new instructional content for GolfPass, as well as an autobiographical web series.

In February 2020, it was reported that Golf Channel would consolidate its television operations with the remainder of NBC Sports at its facilities in Stamford, Connecticut, in a move expected to occur over the next 12 to 18 months. The GolfNow and GolfPass services will continue to primarily operate from Orlando. With the move to Stamford, Golf Channel also ended its long-time morning show Morning Drive, replacing it with the new midday show Golf Today from Stamford beginning January 4, 2021.

In 2021, amid the renewal of NBC Sports' rights to the circuit, and the upcoming shutdown of long-time sister network NBCSN (the former Versus), NBCUniversal began to put a greater emphasis on Golf Channel's rights to the PGA Tour. That November, it was announced that early-round coverage of the Open Championship, U.S. Open (which moved to Golf Channel after NBC re-acquired the rights to USGA tournaments in 2020), and their women's counterparts, would move to USA Network in 2022. At the 2022 Players Championship, Golf Channel adopted a special logo used on-air during PGA Tour telecasts and studio programming, which is co-branded with elements of the PGA Tour logo.

Programming

Event coverage 
Golf Channel is the pay television rightsholder of the PGA Tour, broadcasting live coverage of early rounds, and early window coverage of weekend rounds prior to network television coverage. Some events (particularly, early-season events such as the former Fall Series, and alternate events held against majors) are broadcast in their entirety by the network. Golf Channel airs primetime encores of each round during PGA Tour events, including network television broadcasts from NBC or CBS where applicable. Golf Channel also broadcasts coverage of PGA Tour Champions and Korn Ferry Tour events. Outside of events organized by the PGA Tour, Golf Channel also carries coverage of the European Tour, LPGA Tour, and Asian Tour.

Golf Channel was the cable broadcaster of two of the men's majors, including the U.S. Open and other USGA championships (since June 2020) and the Open Championship (since 2016, including their women's and senior men's events). In November 2021, it was announced that early round coverage of the U.S. Open, the Open Championship, the U.S. Women's Open, and the Women's British Open, would move to USA Network beginning in 2022.

Since 2016, it participates in NBCUniversal's coverage of the Summer Olympics by covering its golf competitions. It has also carried coverage of the Ryder Cup and Solheim Cup alongside NBC, and the NCAA Division I Men's and Women's golf championships

Since its integration with NBC Sports, Golf Channel has been infrequently used as an overflow channel for non-golf programming, including two games of the 2018 Stanley Cup playoffs (due to programming conflicts with USA Network and CNBC), and as part of NBC's "Championship Sunday" effort to televise all matches on the final matchday of the Premier League soccer season.

News and analysis 
Golf Central
Golf Today

Factual and reality
Feherty
Golf's Greatest Rounds
Shotmakers

Instructional
Golf Channel Academy
PGA Tour Champions Learning Center
Playing Lessons
School Of Golf
The Golf Fix

Notable personalities
Golf Channel uses a number of people for tournament, news and instructional programming.

Current personalities

Hosts / Reporters

Tom Abbott
Matt Adams
Cara Banks
Grant Boone
Steve Burkowski
Vince Cellini
Jaime Diaz
Kira K. Dixon
Terry Gannon
Damon Hack
Dan Hicks
Rex Hoggard
Anna Jackson
Rich Lerner
Todd Lewis
Eamon Lynch
Bob Papa
Jimmy Roberts
Amy Rogers
Steve Sands
George Savaricas
Mike Tirico

Analysts

Paul Azinger
Notah Begay III
Amanda Blumenherst
Billy Ray Brown
Curt Byrum
Brandel Chamblee
Kay Cockerill
John Cook
Brad Faxon
Jim Gallagher Jr.
Tripp Isenhour
Smylie Kaufman
Paige Mackenzie
Arron Oberholser
Morgan Pressel
Mark Rolfing
Karen Stupples
Johnson Wagner
John Wood

Notable former personalities

Brian Anderson
Billy Andrade (2010–2012)
Shane Bacon (2021-2022)
Lara Baldesarra (2012–2013)
Adam Barr
Michael Breed
Ryan Burr (2012-2020)
Donna Caponi-Byrnes
Lisa Cornwell (2014-2020)
Robert Damron
Beth Daniel (2007–2010)
Charles Davis
Steve Duemig
David Feherty (2011-2022)
Jerry Foltz (1999–2022)
Matt Gogel (2007-2021)
Jim Gray
Brian Hammons (1995–2015)
Trevor Immelman (2016–2022)
Kraig Kann (1995–2011)
Jim Kelly
Peter Kessler (1995–2002)
Gary Koch (1996–2022)
Erik Kuselias (2011–2012)
Justin Leonard (2015–2022)
Ann Liguori
Nancy Lopez
Mark Lye
Jim "Bones" Mackay (2017–2022)
Andrew Magee
John Mahaffey (2004–2019)
Roger Maltbie (1991–2022)
Chantel McCabe
Win McMurry
Johnny Miller (2011–2019)
Jennifer Mills (1995–2006)
Frank Nobilo (2004–2019)
Peter Oosterhuis (1995–2014)
Phil Parkin (2006–2015)
Dottie Pepper (2005–2012)
Judy Rankin (2010–2022)
Ahmad Rashad (2013)
Tim Rosaforte (2007–2019)
Charlie Rymer
Kristina Shalhoup
Val Skinner (2002–2013)
Holly Sonders (2011–2014)
Stephanie Sparks (2000–2013)
Kathryn Tappen (2022)
Brian Tennyson
Lauren Thompson (2008–2020)
Kelly Tilghman
Ted Tryba
Bob Valvano
Scott Van Pelt (1995–2000)
Gary Williams (2011–2020)

Viewership
For the month of October 2013, Golf Channel averaged a daily viewership of 84,000.

International version

Canada
The Golf Channel is also available in Canada on most cable and satellite providers, as it is authorized for carriage as a foreign cable television service by the Canadian Radio-television and Telecommunications Commission. While it mostly airs the American feed, live events coverage is subject to blackouts due to TSN holding many of its broadcasting rights domestically.

Golf Channel UK
A British version of the channel called Golf Channel UK was operated by sporting goods retailer JJB Sports, and was available on the BSkyB satellite service. It broadcast many of the programs seen on the U.S. channel, but was unable to attract a viable audience as it offered few live golf tournaments; the channel shut down on December 31, 2007.

Since the acquisition of Sky plc by Comcast in late-2018, NBC Sports properties have begun to increase their collaboration with Sky Sports for expanded coverage of relevant events; Golf Channel and Sky Sports Golf trialed on-air talent sharing and co-productions at the 2019 Players Championship.

Golf Channel Latin America
The Latin American version of the Golf Channel was launched in 2006 as a DirecTV joint venture, and was acquired from DirecTV by former DirecTV executives Jason Markham and Evan Grayer together with Inversiones Bahia in 2018. The channel broadcasts professional tournaments from the PGA Tour, PGA Tour Latinoamérica, European Tour and LPGA Tour with Spanish-speaking journalists, as well as Golf Central and other English-language shows. In 2019, Discovery bought the channel.

References

External links 
 

 
Golf in the United States
Golf on NBC
Golf on television
English-language television stations in the United States
Television channels and stations established in 1995
Companies based in Orlando, Florida
Sports television networks in the United States